Grande-Vallée is a municipality in the Gaspésie-Îles-de-la-Madeleine region of the province of Quebec in Canada.

Its name (French for "Great Valley") describes its location in a large fertile valley through which the Grand Vallée River flows.

History

In 1691, Governor General Frontenac granted the area to François Hazeur, a prosperous merchant from Quebec City. The seignory, called La Grande-Vallée-des-Monts, stretched from Rivière-Magdeleine Seignory in the west to the Saint-Hélier portage in the east. It was inherited by Hazeur's son-in-law, Michel Sarrazin, a surgeon, biologist, and doctor of the King.

In September 1758, the Wolfe's troop chatched a French at Grande-Vallée. It's te deportation of Gaspésie.

Grande-Vallée was founded in 1842. Alexis Caron, of Saint-Thomas-de-Montmagny, his wife Angélique Frigault and his kids, ...

No colonization took place until the 1830s, when fishermen of Saint-Thomas-de-Montmagny occupied the place during the summer. In 1842, Alexis Caron and his family, also from Saint-Thomas-de-Montmagny, became the first permanent settlers. In 1846, the mission of Saint-François-Xavier-de-Grande-Vallée was founded. In 1872, the post office opened.

In 1927, the village was incorporated as a parish municipality, with Arthur S. Fournier as first mayor, although its status as parish municipality was not officially recognized until 1995. In 2005, Grande-Vallée changed its status from parish municipality to just municipality.

Geography

Communities
The following locations reside within the municipality's boundaries:
Grande-Vallée-des-Monts – a hamlet located along Rivière de la Grande Vallée 
L'Anse-à-Mercier – a hamlet located on the Saint Lawrence River

Lakes & Rivers

The following waterways pass through or are situated within the municipality's boundaries:
Rivière de la Grande Vallée – a river that empties into Anse de la Rivière de la Grande Vallée
Lac du Rocher – a lake that lies just south of Route 132

Demographics

Population

Language

See also
 List of municipalities in Quebec

References

External links

Incorporated places in Gaspésie–Îles-de-la-Madeleine
Municipalities in Quebec